Alfred Stone may refer to:
 
Alfred Stone (musician) (1840–1878), English organist and choir-trainer
Alfred Stone (architect) (1834–1908), American architect from Rhode Island; partner in Stone, Carpenter & Willson
Alfred Holt Stone (1879–1955), American planter, writer, politician, from Mississippi
Alfred P. Stone (1813–1865), American politician from Ohio

See also
Alan Stone (disambiguation)
Albert Stone (born 1916), owner of Sterilite and a philanthropist from Townsend, Massachusetts
Stone (surname)
Stones (surname)